Metal amides (systematic name metal azanides) are a class of coordination compounds composed of a metal center with amide ligands of the form NR2−. Amide ligands have two electron pairs available for bonding. In principle, they can be terminal or bridging. In these two examples, the dimethylamido ligands are both bridging and terminal:

In practice, bulky amide ligands have a lesser tendency to bridge. Amide ligands may participate in metal-ligand π-bonding giving a complex with the metal center being co-planar with the nitrogen and substituents. Metal bis(trimethylsilyl)amides form a significant subcategory of metal amide compounds. These compounds tend to be discrete and soluble in organic solvents.

Alkali metal amides

Lithium amides are the most important amides, as they are readily prepared from n-butyllithium and the appropriate amine, and they are more stable and soluble than the other alkali metal analogs. Potassium amides are prepared by transmetallation of lithium amides with potassium t-butoxide (see also Schlosser base) or by reaction of the amine with potassium, potassium hydride, n-butylpotassium, or benzylpotassium.

The alkali metal amides, MNH2 (M = Li, Na, K) are commercially available. Sodium amide (also known as sodamide) is synthesized from sodium metal and ammonia with ferric nitrate catalyst. The sodium compound is white, but the presence of metallic iron turns the commercial material gray.

2 Na  +  2 NH3  →  2 NaNH2  +  H2

Lithium diisopropylamide is a popular non-nucleophilic base used in organic synthesis. Unlike many other bases, the steric bulk prevents this base from acting as a nucleophile. It is commercially available, usually as a solution in hexane. It may be readily prepared from n-butyllithium and diisopropylamine.

Transition metal complexes
Early transition metal amides may be prepared by treating anhydrous metal chloride with alkali amide reagents, or with two equivalents of amine, the second equivalent acting as a base:

MCln + n LiNR2 → M(NR2)n + n LiCl
MCln + 2n HNR2 → M(NR2)n + n HNR2·HCl

Transition metal amide complexes may be prepared by:
 treating a halide complex with an alkali amide
 treating an alkoxide complex with an amine
 deprotonation of a coordinated amine
 oxidative addition of an amine

With two organic substituents, amides derived from secondary amines can be especially bulky ligands.

Amides as intermediates
Transition metal amides are intermediates in the base-induced substitution of transition metal ammine complexes.  Thus the Sn1CB mechanism for the displacement of chloride from chloropentamminecobalt chloride by hydroxide proceeds via an amido intermediate:
[Co(NH3)5Cl]2+  +  OH−  →  [Co(NH3)4(NH2)]2+  +  H2O  +  Cl−
[Co(NH3)4NH2]2+  +   H2O  →  [Co(NH3)5OH]2+

See also
Inorganic imide

References

 
Coordination chemistry